is one of the original 40 throws of Judo as developed by Kano Jigoro.  It belongs to the fourth group of the traditional throwing list in the Gokyo no waza of the Kodokan Judo. It is also part of the current 67 Throws of Kodokan Judo. It is classified as a side sacrifice technique (yoko-sutemi).

Technique description 
With the tani-otoshi, you place your leg behind both legs of your opponent while still holding him in your favorite kumi kata and then pull the opponent backwards, resulting in your opponent falling on his back and you falling sideways.

Technique history

Similar techniques, variants, and aliases 
English aliases:

 Valley drop

Similar techniques
 Uki waza
 Yoko otoshi
 Tani otoshi  

Somehow related
 Yoko wakare

See also
 Judo technique
 The Canon Of Judo

External links 
 Information on the Techniques of Judo

Judo technique
Throw (grappling)